South Asian Airlines is a charter airline from Bangladesh. It was founded in 1998 and commenced operations in 1999. The airline has its main hub at the Shahjalal International Airport and its fleet comprises four Robinson R66 aircraft.

Fleet

See also
 List of airlines of Bangladesh

References

External links
 Official website

Airlines of Bangladesh
Airlines established in 1998
Bangladeshi companies established in 1998